Ajen Yohl Mat also known as Aj Neʼ Ohl Mat, Ac Kan and Ahl Lawal Mat, (died August 8, 612) was an ajaw of the Maya city-state of Palenque. He acceded to the throne on January 1, 605 and ruled until his death. He was probably the son of Yohl Ikʼnal or Sak Kʼukʼ and the brother of Janahb Pakal or Kʼinich Janaab Pakal I. During his reign, his kingdom was invaded on April 4, 611 by Scroll Serpent, ruler of the Kaan kingdom (Calakmul).

Notes

Sources 

612 deaths
Rulers of Palenque
7th-century monarchs in North America
Year of birth unknown
7th century in the Maya civilization